My Six Convicts is a 1952 American film noir crime drama directed by Hugo Fregonese. The screenplay was adapted by Michael Blankfort from the autobiographical book My Six Convicts: A Psychologist's Three Years in Fort Leavenworth, written by Donald Powell Wilson.

The film stars Millard Mitchell, Gilbert Roland, John Beal and Marshall Thompson. Mitchell won a Golden Globe Award for his performance.

Plot
Prison psychologist Doc attempts to help his incarcerated patients.

Cast
Millard Mitchell as James Connie
Gilbert Roland as Punch Pinero
John Beal as "Doc"
Marshall Thompson as Blivens Scott
Alf Kjellin as Clem Randall
Henry Morgan as Dawson
Jay Adler as Steve Kopac
Regis Toomey as Dr. Gordon
Fay Roope as the Warden
Carleton Young as Captain Haggerty
John Marley as Knotty Johnson
Russ Conway as Dr. Hughes
Byron Foulger as Dr. Brint
Charles Bronson as Jocko (credited as Charles Buchinsky)
Uncredited

 Wesley Addy as Convict
 Jack Carr as Harry Higgins
 Dick Curtis as Guard
 George Eldredge as Convict #3
 Fred Kelsey as Store detective
 Shirley Mills as Blonde Tilly
 Frank Mitchell as Convict #3007
 Billy Nelson as Guard
 Joe Palma as Convict driver
 Eddie Parker as Guard on dump trunk
 Barney Phillips as Baker, the foreman
 Carol Savage as Mrs. Randall
 Charles Sullivan as Driscoll

Style 
While dealing with serious issues, the film conveys a comedic tone. The film is true to the overall spirit of the book upon which it is based, but dramatic license was taken with certain events that were created solely to add dramatic elements. For example, the failed prison break and the resulting death of an innocent inmate are fictional plot points not found in Donald Powell Wilson's book, although the book may itself contain plot contrivances.

Production 
The film was shot on location at San Quentin State Prison, where warden Clinton Duffy had implemented reforms that sought to rehabilitate prisoners much in the same way as does the Doc character.

Because of San Quentin's strict policy prohibiting women from entering the inner prison area, a short prison guard was asked to impersonate the Mrs. Randall character in long shots. Actress Carol Savage portrayed the character in closeup studio shots.

Musical director Dimitri Tiomkin visited Sing Sing prison to hear the prisoners' band and songs sung by the prisoners in preparation for his film score.

Reception 
In a contemporary review for The New York Times, critic A. H. Weiler wrote: "... [P]enology, psychology and crime have been blended into a compassionate, thoughtful, incisive and, above all, genuinely humorous account of life behind prison walls. ... There may be doubters who will scoff at the possibility of a convict such as Connie being permitted to leave the penitentiary (under guard) to open a bank safe but as played by Millard Mitchell, who runs off with the acting honors, the facts are not particularly important."

Director Hugo Fregonese received fan letters from prison inmates and said, "I'm flattered. After all, these are the first fan letters I've ever received."

Accolades

References

External links
 
 
 
 

1952 films
1952 comedy-drama films
American comedy-drama films
American biographical drama films
American black-and-white films
Columbia Pictures films
Films scored by Dimitri Tiomkin
Films based on biographies
American prison comedy films
Films featuring a Best Supporting Actor Golden Globe winning performance
American prison drama films
1950s prison films
Films directed by Hugo Fregonese
1950s English-language films
1950s American films